Archaeocasis is a genus of moths in the family Geometridae.

Larentiinae
Geometridae genera